Georgetown High School is a public high school located in Georgetown, South Carolina, United States. It is one of four high schools in the Georgetown County School District.

History
Georgetown was preceded by Winyah School for whites and Howard School for African Americans until the 1980s.

Academics 
Georgetown High School offers seven Advanced Placement courses:
 AB Calculus
 Biology
 Human Geography
 Macroeconomics
 US Government & Politics
 US History
 World History

Athletics 
Georgetown High School offers: baseball, boys' and girls' basketball, cheerleading, cross country, football, golf, boys' and girls' soccer, softball, swimming, tennis, track and field, volleyball, and wrestling.

Awards
In the school year 2018–2019, the NJROTC Battalion housed in Georgetown High School was named the top unit within the Area 6 region. This region includes all of South and North Carolina.

References 

Public high schools in South Carolina
Schools in Georgetown County, South Carolina
Buildings and structures in Georgetown, South Carolina